Kayakentsky District (Qayagentli yaq) is an administrative and municipal district (raion), one of the forty-one in the Republic of Dagestan, Russia. It is located in the east of the republic. Its administrative center is the rural locality (a selo) of Novokayakent. As of the 2010 Census, the total population of the district was 54,089, with the population of Novokayakent accounting for 9.5% of that number.

Administrative and municipal status
Within the framework of administrative divisions, Kayakentsky District is one of the forty-one in the Republic of Dagestan. The district is divided into five selsoviets which comprise nineteen rural localities. As a municipal division, the district is incorporated as Kayakentsky Municipal District. Its five selsoviets are incorporated as fourteen rural settlements within the municipal district. The selo of Novokayakent serves as the administrative center of both the administrative and municipal district.

References

Notes

Sources

External links
Unofficial website of Kayakentsky District 

Districts of Dagestan
